Edoardo Corvi (born 23 March 2001) is an Italian professional footballer who plays as a goalkeeper for  club Parma.

Club career
Corvi was formed as a player in Parma youth system.

He was loaned to Serie C club Legnago Salus, and made his professional debut on 2 May 2021 against Fermana. His loan was extended for the next season.

References

External links
 
 

2001 births
Living people
Sportspeople from Parma
Italian footballers
Association football goalkeepers
Serie C players
Parma Calcio 1913 players
F.C. Legnago Salus players
Footballers from Emilia-Romagna